Prince Evgenii Nikolaevitch Troubetzkoy (5 October 1863 – 5 February 1920) was a Russian philosopher and a follower of Vladimir Solovyov. He was the son of Prince Nikolai Petrovitch Trubetskoy, co-founder of the Moscow Conservatory, and Sophia Alekseievna Lopouchina. His mother was a big influence on his religious thought. He was close to his brother, Sergei Nikolaevich Trubetskoy, who was also a philosopher.

Russian paleontologist and Christian apologist Alexander V. Khramov (Borissiak Paleontological Institute of the Russian Academy of Sciences, Ph.D. from Moscow University) attributes his ideas about an atemporal human fall to Troubetzkoy and Nikolai Berdyaev.

References

External link

1863 births
1920 deaths
Writers from Moscow
People from Moskovsky Uyezd
Russian Constitutional Democratic Party members
Party of Peaceful Renovation politicians
Members of the State Council (Russian Empire)
Russian philosophers